Thisuri Yuwanika Madduma Liyanage (born March 6, 1991), popularly as Thisuri Yuwanika, is an actress in Sri Lankan cinema, theater and television. Started as a child artist in 1994, Yuwanika has been awarded Best Upcoming Teledrama Actress and Best Actress in multiple times in several award festivals.

Early life, background and education 
She is the only child of Susantha Chandramali and Kumaru Liyanage. Her mother, Susantha Chandramali is a well renowned actress in Sri Lanka who is considered an icon in the Sri Lankan drama field for more than 25 years.

Thisuri attended Anula Vidyalaya, Nugegoda up to Advanced Level (A/L) examination which was done in Arts Stream (French, Sinhalese and Logic). Then she started following a Business Studies degree which is on hold currently due to her acting career. Thisuri is married to longtime partner, Suraj , a marine engineer

Acting career 
Thisuri made her acting debut with her mother in Punchi Kumarige Naththala (1994) when she was just 3 years old. Then she had the chance to act in Sudath Devapriya's Udu Gang Yamaya (2001).

After her school life she started to actively take part in dramas. In 2013, she was awarded the Best Upcoming Actress for Avasarai Piyabanna. Then she had the privilege to act in Rukmal Nirosh's Sulanga Matha Mohothak which helped her to disclose her acting skills to the public. She did the character of 'Charulatha' in that drama and she was awarded the Best Actress award in Sumathi Awards in 2015 while she was just 24 years old.

Awards 
 Best Upcoming Actress in Sumathi Awards in 2013
 Best Actress in National Awards in 2014
 Best Actress in Sumathi Awards in 2015
 Best Actress in Sumathi Awards in 2019

Television

Filmography

References 

 http://sumathiawards.lk/sumathi-awards-winners.php
 http://gossips.srilankaactress.info/2010/10/30/mother-is-my-shadow-thisuri-yuwanika/
 http://papper.lankahotnews.co.uk/2015/07/thisuri-yuwanika.html
 http://www.gossipsonline.com/interview-with-thisuri-yuwanika/
 http://starfriends.lk/thisuri-yuwanika
 http://gospelcinemission.blogspot.com.au/p/demo.html
 https://www.imdb.com/name/nm2385774/

External links 
 Thisuri Yuwanika on Facebook
මිණිගං දෑලක ජීවන අන්දරය

Sri Lankan film actresses
Sinhalese actresses
1991 births
Living people
Sri Lankan stage actresses
Sri Lankan television actresses